Guryevsky District is the name of several administrative and municipal districts in Russia.
Guryevsky District, Kaliningrad Oblast, an administrative district of Kaliningrad Oblast
Guryevsky District, Kemerovo Oblast, an administrative and municipal district of Kemerovo Oblast

See also
Guryevsky (disambiguation)

References